A Night Out is a 1961 Australian television play. It was based on A Night Out by Harold Pinter. It starred John Ewart and Richard Meikle.

The play had previously been filmed in England in 1960 for Armchair Theater. It was one of three plays the BBC commissioned from Pinter. The BBC also did the play for radio a version which had been broadcast in Australia by the ABC. The TV production was shot in Sydney.

Plot
Albert is dominated by his mother. He is goaded at work by the accountant Gidney. He is driven to an act of violence and attempts to assert his individuality. He tries to be a "real man" with a girl who picks him up. Mr King holds the party that is the night out for everyone.

Cast
John Ewart as Albert 
Neva Carr-Glynn as Mother 
Brigid Lenihan as Girl 
Noel Brophy as Mr. King 
James Elliott    
Tom Farley    
John Godfrey    
Nat Levison    
Richard Meikle as Gidney 
Joseph Szabo
Carole Boyce
Carole Taylor
Lou Vernon
Martin Magee

Production
Designed Desmonde Dowling constructed four unique sets. It was the 20th live play directed by Alan Burke who said "though this is a drama it is never far from comedy. Pinter's special talent is to see the ironic humour in ordinary people's frustrations, as well as the incipient horror in their most everyday actions. The playwright's vivid life among people with tangy speech and his experience as an actor give him an extraordinary command of language."

Release
The Sunday Sydney Morning Herald called it "a brilliant bit of production, and one of the best contemporary dramas the Sydney studios of the A.B.C. has done yet. "

The Sydney Morning Herald thought Ewart was "excellent" but felt the female leads over-acted.

See also
List of television plays broadcast on Australian Broadcasting Corporation (1960s)

References

External links

1961 television plays
Australian television plays
Films directed by Alan Burke (director)